Budjala is a territory and a locality of Sud-Ubangi province in the Democratic Republic of the Congo, located in the northwestern part of the country, 900 km northeast of the capital Kinshasa.

In the surroundings around Budjala, mainly green-green deciduous forest grows. The region has a savanna climate. The rainy month is August, with an average of  rainfall, and the driest is January, with  rainfall.

Sectors 
The territory of Budjala is divided into five sectors, in addition to the town of Budjala:

 Banza (capital Bango-Nzembe): 14 groupings of 92 villages
 Bolingo (capital Balaw): 19 groupings of 121 villages
 Ngombe Doko De Likimi (capital Likimi): 7 groupings of 76 villages
 Mongala-Kuma (capital Dongo): 12 groupings of 98 villages
 Ndolo Liboko (capital Likaw): 18 groupings of 88 villages

References 

Territories of Sud-Ubangi Province